Amherst is a surname.  Notable people with the surname include:

 Baron Amherst (disambiguation), in particular:
 Jeffery Amherst, 1st Baron Amherst (1717–1797), British army officer
 William Amherst (British Army officer) (1732–1781), younger brother of the above
 Baron Amherst of Hackney, created 1892 for:
William Tyssen-Amherst, 1st Baron Amherst of Hackney
Alicia Amherst (1865–1941), gardening historian and daughter of the above
 Earl Amherst:
 William Amherst, 1st Earl Amherst, Governor-General of India from August 1823 to February 1828
 William Amherst, 2nd Earl Amherst
 Josceline Amherst, Australian politician and fifth son of the 2nd earl
 William Amherst, 3rd Earl Amherst
 Hugh Amherst, 4th Earl Amherst
 Jeffery Amherst, 5th Earl Amherst
Elizabeth Amherst Hale (1774 – 1826), Canadian artist born Elizabeth Frances Amherst